Tabiteuea (formerly Drummond's Island) is an atoll in the Gilbert Islands, Kiribati, farther south of Tarawa. This atoll is the bigger and the most populated of the Gilbert Islands but Tarawa. The atoll consists of one main island,  in the north, and several smaller islets in between along the eastern rim of the atoll. The population numbered 5,261 in 2015. The islanders have customary fishing practices related to the lagoon and the open ocean.

While most atolls of the Gilbert Islands correspond to local government areas governed by island councils, Tabiteuea, like the main atoll Tarawa, is divided into two:

History
"Tabiteuea" is Gilbertese for "no chief allowed"; the island is traditionally egalitarian and is known for its huge maneaba.

On 1 July 1799, Charles Bishop and George Bass entered in the lagoon of Tabiteuea and many canoes visited his brig Nautilus. Bishop called it Bishop’s Island, and called , Drummond’s Island.

The Battle of Drummond's Island occurred during the United States Exploring Expedition in April 1841 at Tabiteuea, then known as Drummond's Island. After one sailor from sloop USS Peacock, was missing without reason, the US party decided on exacting redress for the incident. Twelve islanders were killed in the fighting and others were wounded. Utiroa village with more than 1,000 inhabitants, was burned and erased.

During the American Civil War, the Confederate States Navy steamer CSS Shenandoah visited the island on March 23, 1865 in search of United States whalers, but the whalers had fled the area. Captain James Waddell described the islanders as "of copper colour, short of statue, athletic in form, intelligent and docile" and were "without a stitch of clothing".

In the late 1800s, the two parts of the island were the site of a religious war when the populace of North Tabiteuea, partly converted to Christianity and, led by a Hawaiian pastor called Kapu who had assembled a "hymn-singing army on a crusade", invaded and conquered South Tabiteuea, where was recently (1860) created a cult of Tioba (Jehovah).

Bishop Octave Terrienne built his main Catholic Church in Tanaeang, North Tabiteuea in 1936 and established there the see of his apostolic vicariate of the Gilbert and Ellice Islands.

Tabiteuea Post Office opened around 1911 and was renamed Tabiteuea North around 1972. Tabiteuea South Post Office opened on 13 September 1965.

Education
There is a government high school, Tabiteuea North Senior Secondary School, also known as Teabike College. Located in Eita, it serves the entire island.

There is also a government junior high school, Takoronga School in Terikiai, serving all of Tab North.

The elementary schools on Tab North are all government schools. They include:

 Aiwa: Nukantewaa School, which also serves Bangai
 Buota: Taunibong School, which also serves Tanaeang
 Eita: Temwamwang School, which serves a portion of Eita as well as Utiroa; the school does not serve all of Eita, as Eita and Utiroa are both the settlements with the most people in Tabiteuea North.

Taunibong School in Buota serves as the elementary school. The area junior high school is Takoronga School in Terikiai, and the area senior high school is Tabiteuea North Senior Secondary School a.k.a. Teabike College in Eita.

 Kabuna: Kabuna School
 Tekaman: Burannikoraoi School, which also serves Tekabwibwi
 Terikiai: Takoronga School, which also serves a section of Eita; Kiribati authorities included a section of Eita in its attendance zone to relieve Temwamwang School
 Tanaatoorua: Ueen Maungan te Raoi School, which also serves Bangai
 Taumwa: Auriaria School
 Taku: Taku School

Students from Bangai may attend either Nukantewaa School or Ueen Maungan te Raoi School; Bangai does not have enough residents, so the Kiribati authorities do not operate a school there.

Transport
There are two domestic airports:

 Tabiteuea North Airport that is the main hub serving the southern Gilbert Islands;
 Tabiteuea South Airport, only serving South Tabiteuea.

Gallery

References

External links 
 Exhibit: The Alfred Agate Collection: The United States Exploring Expedition, 1838-1842 from the Navy Art Gallery

 
Gilbert Islands
Atolls of Kiribati